Simon Bryant may refer to:

 Sir Simon Bryant (RAF officer) (born 1956)
 Simon Bryant (chef) (born 1965), Australian chef
 Simon Bryant (footballer) (born 1982), former footballer for Bristol Rovers